Haplothrips ganglbaueri is a species of thrips. It is a pest of millets.

References

Phlaeothripidae
Insect pests of millets